Mr. and Mrs. Khiladi (English: Mr. and Mrs. Player) is a 1997 Indian Hindi-language romantic comedy film directed by David Dhawan. The film was a remake of the 1992 Telugu film Aa Okkati Adakku which itself was remade from Tamil film Paaru Paaru Pattanam Paaru. It stars Akshay Kumar and Juhi Chawla. Some scenes take place in Toronto,  Ontario, Canada. The fifth installment of the Khiladi series, Mr. and Mrs. Khiladi predominantly explores comedy genre, unlike other films in the series. The film was a semi-hit at the box office.

Summary 
When his astrologer uncle (Satish Kaushik) predicts a favorable future for Raja (Akshay Kumar), he decides to do nothing until the prediction comes true.

One day he meets a woman at a bus stop, she tries to talk to him but he replies to her rudely because his uncle told him to not talk to an unmarried girl. He finds out that she is married, he tries to get frank with her but suddenly her husband arrives to beat him. Raja then collides with Shalu's (Juhi Chawla) car. She is the daughter of a millionaire (Kader Khan). He is seriously injured and Shalu is arrested. His uncle meets him in the hospital and tells him that he should forgive Shalu. He says to the inspector that this is his mistake, and they should release Shalu. They release Shalu from jail and then she goes to meet Raja but he doesn`t want to meet her. She falls in love with him, Shalu tells her father that her future husband has arrived. However, his lazy lifestyle does not meet with his future father-in-law's standards, and he insists that Raja does some hard work and bring him ₹100,000 to have Suhag Raat with his daughter. Eventually Raja accomplishes this by defeating Kaalu Pehelwan (Emmanuel Yarborough) in a wrestling match.

Cast
 Akshay Kumar as Raja / Rajant Kapoor (Mr. Khiladi)
 Juhi Chawla as Shalu Prasad (Mrs. Khiladi)
 Kader Khan as Badri Prasad
 Paresh Rawal as Pratap (Shalu's Uncle)
 Himani Shivpuri as Raja's mother
 Prachi as Kiran Kapoor (Raja's Sister)
 Satish Kaushik as Mama (Raja's Uncle)
 Johnny Lever as a bandaged patient on the street
 Gulshan Grover as Vicky 
 Emmanuel Yarborough as Kaalu 
 Anil Dhawan as Bose Babu
 Upasna Singh as Pratap's Girlfriend
 Rakesh Bedi as Ram Babu
 Mac Mohan as Police Inspector
 Shashi Kiran as Postman
 Birbal as Pandit
 Gurbachchan Singh as Angry Husband
 Babbanlal Yadav as Constable
 Kishore Bhanushali as Bandwala

Principal photography
The shooting of the song "Akela Hai Mr. Khiladi" took place in Ontario, Canada. Some parts of it were shot at the Niagara Falls, while the other part (75%) was shot near the Square One Shopping Centre in Mississauga. The Central Library and other buildings nearby were shown. The song Jara Parde Pe Ane De was shot inside BCE Place in Toronto.

Music
The music for the movie was composed by Anu Malik and many of the songs were hits.

See also
List of Bollywood films of 1997#Releases

References

External links
 

1997 films
1990s Hindi-language films
Films directed by David Dhawan
Films scored by Anu Malik
Indian romantic comedy films
Films shot in Toronto
1997 romantic comedy films
Hindi remakes of Telugu films